Bob Bryan and Mike Bryan were the defending champions, but lost in the semifinals to Mahesh Bhupathi and Mark Knowles.

Daniel Nestor and Nenad Zimonjić won in the final 6–3, 7–6(11–9), against Mahesh Bhupathi and Mark Knowles.

Seeds
All seeds receive a bye into the second round.

Draw

Finals

Top half

Bottom half

External links
Draw

Doubles